Venceslas Kruta (born 4 November 1939) is a French archaeologist and historian. He is the director of European protohistory studies at the École pratique des Hautes Études (EPHE), and Professor emeritus at the Sorbonne University. Kruta has also directed the Centre d'Études Celtiques in Paris and the journal Études Celtiques, and has chaired the editorial board of the journal  (CNRS).

Kruta specializes on the protohistory of Europe, more specifically the commercial and cultural relations between Central Europe and the Mediterranean. He has directed numerous excavation sites, most notably the parvis of Notre-Dame and the Square Court of the Louvre in Paris.

Biography 
Venceslas Kruta was born on 4 November 1939 in Saumur, Pays de la Loire. He studied prehistory and archeology at Masaryk University in Czechoslovakia between 1956 and 1961, then worked as an assistant at the Czech Academy of Sciences between 1963 and 1971. He obtained a doctorate in history from Sorbonne University in 1974. 

In 1991, he directed an international exposition on the Celts in Venice, then another in Tokyo in 1998.

References 

1939 births
Living people
20th-century French historians
20th-century French archaeologists
People from Saumur
Celtic studies scholars